Chris Rogers may refer to:

 Chris Rogers (cricketer) (born 1977), Australian cricketer
 Chris Rogers (jockey) (1924–1976), thoroughbred horse racing jockey
 Chris Rogers (journalist) (born 1975), British newscaster
 Chris Rogers (mathematician) (born 1954), mathematician
 Chris Rogers (rugby union) (born 1956), South African rugby union player

See also
 Chris Rodgers (born 1976), English golfer
 Christopher Rodgers (disambiguation)